Crystalloid may refer to:
A substance that, when dissolved, forms a true solution and is able to pass through a semipermeable membrane. They get separated from colloids during dialysis.
Crystalloid solution, a type of volume expander